The .224 Boz cartridge was developed in the late 1990s, designed as a candidate replacement cartridge for adoption as the standardized NATO ("STANAG") Personal defense weapon PDW round, originally solicited to replace the longstanding NATO standard (STANAG) 9×19mm Parabellum. It was going to be the British entry, to be evaluated alongside the Belgian FN 5.7x28mm and the German HK 4.6×30mm armor-piercing cartridges. The solicitation would also seek to find, test and standardize a PDW cartridge capable of, at the minimum, defeating the Collaborative Research Into Small Arms Technology (CRISAT) body armour of the time.

Design
During development a version based upon the 9x19 Parabellum case was also evaluated, which carried the significant advantage of being able to be utilized in pre-existing NATO standard 9x19 Parabellum caliber firearms by means of a relatively cheap barrel and caliber swap. The 22 TCM takes advantage of this same concept in its sub-variant, the 22 TCM 9R.

See also
.22 TCM
.22 Spitfire
HK 4.6×30mm
5.7×28mm
Table of handgun and rifle cartridges

References

224 Boz
224 Boz